Diplulmaris is a genus of jellyfish in the family Ulmaridae.

Species 
Diplulmaris antarctica
Diplulmaris malayensis

References

Ulmaridae
Scyphozoan genera